The George Parker Long House is a historic house in Winnfield, Louisiana, U.S.. It was built in 1905, and designed in the Queen Anne architectural style. It has been listed on the National Register of Historic Places since August 11, 1982.

References

Houses on the National Register of Historic Places in Louisiana
Queen Anne architecture in Louisiana
Colonial Revival architecture in Louisiana
Houses completed in 1905
Buildings and structures in Winn Parish, Louisiana
1905 establishments in Louisiana